CASD can refer to:
 California Area School District
 Coatesville Area School District
 Continuous at Sea Deterrent, principle behind the United Kingdom's nuclear weapons programme
 United States District Court for the Southern District of California